The 1983 Minnesota Twins finished 70–92, tied for fifth in the AL West. 858,939 fans attended Twins games, the third-lowest total in the American League.

Offseason 
 January 12, 1983: Bob Veselic was traded by the Twins to the Houston Astros for Rick Lysander.
 January 31, 1983: Mike Hart was signed as a free agent by the Twins.
 March 25, 1983: Sal Butera was traded by the Twins to the Detroit Tigers for Stine Poole (minors) and cash.
 March 25, 1983: Pete Redfern was released by the Twins.

Regular season 

Only one Twins player made the All-Star Game, outfielder Gary Ward.

Offense 

 Kent Hrbek hit .297 with 16 HR and 84 RBI.
 Gary Ward hit .278 with 19 HR and 88 RBI.
 Gary Gaetti hit 21 HR and 78 RBI.
 Tom Brunansky hit 28 HR and 82 RBI.

Pitching 

Starter Ken Schrom was 15-8.
Reliever Ron Davis had 30 saves.

Season standings

Record vs. opponents

Notable transactions 
 May 12, 1983: Tom Klawitter was signed as a free agent by the Twins.
 June 6, 1983: Tim Belcher was drafted by the Twins in the 1st round (1st pick) of the 1983 Major League Baseball draft, but did not sign.

Roster

Player stats

Batting

Starters by position 
Note: Pos = Position; G = Games played; AB = At bats; H = Hits; Avg. = Batting average; HR = Home runs; RBI = Runs batted in

Other batters 
Note: G = Games played; AB = At bats; H = Hits; Avg. = Batting average; HR = Home runs; RBI = Runs batted in

Pitching

Starting pitchers 
Note: G = Games pitched; IP = Innings pitched; W = Wins; L = Losses; ERA = Earned run average; SO = Strikeouts

Other pitchers 
Note: G = Games pitched; IP = Innings pitched; W = Wins; L = Losses; ERA = Earned run average; SO = Strikeouts

Relief pitchers 
Note: G = Games pitched; W = Wins; L = Losses; SV = Saves; ERA = Earned run average; SO = Strikeouts

Farm system

Notes

References

External links 
Player stats from www.baseball-reference.com
Team info from www.baseball-almanac.com

1983
1983 Major League Baseball season
Minnesota Twins